Devara Duddu is a 1977 Indian Kannada-language film, directed by K. S. L. Swamy and produced by N. Rani. The film stars Rajesh, Srinath, Jayanthi, Hema Choudhary and Chandrashekar. The film has musical score by Rajan–Nagendra. The film was a remake of the Tamil film Kaliyuga Kannan.

Cast

Rajesh as Madhoo
Srinath as Krishna
Jayanthi as Ambuja
Chandrashekar as Muddu Krishna
Hema Choudhary as Radha 
Balakrishna
Dwarakish as Balu 
Manorama as Kempamma
Lokanath
Ashwath Narayan

Soundtrack
The music was composed by Rajan–Nagendra.

References

External links
 

1977 films
Indian drama films
Kannada remakes of Tamil films
1970s Kannada-language films
Films scored by Rajan–Nagendra
Films directed by K. S. L. Swamy